Pierre Caron (born 31 August 1936 in Hull, Quebec (now Gatineau, Quebec)) was a Liberal party member of the House of Commons of Canada. He was an insurance broker by career.

He was first elected at the Hull riding in a 29 May 1967 by-election, following the death of his father, Alexis Caron. After completing his term in the 27th Parliament, Pierre Caron left national office and did not seek further re-election to Parliament.

External links
 

1936 births
Living people
Members of the House of Commons of Canada from Quebec
Liberal Party of Canada MPs
Politicians from Gatineau